Won by a Neck is a 1930 American Pre-Code comedy film directed by Fatty Arbuckle and starring Lloyd Hamilton.

Cast
 Lloyd Hamilton
 Ruth Hiatt
 Addie McPhail

See also
 Fatty Arbuckle filmography

References

External links

1930 films
Films directed by Roscoe Arbuckle
1930 comedy films
1930 short films
Educational Pictures short films
American black-and-white films
American comedy short films
1930s American films